Ticuna–Yuri is a small family, perhaps even a dialect continuum, consisting of at least two, and perhaps three, known languages of South America: the major western Amazonian language Ticuna, the poorly attested and extinct Yurí, and the scarcely known language of the largely uncontacted Carabayo. Kaufman (2007: 68) also adds Munichi to the family.

Kaufman (1990, 1994) argues that the connection between the two is convincing even with the limited information available. Carvalho (2009) presented "compelling" evidence for the family (Campbell 2012).

Language contact
Jolkesky (2016) notes that there are lexical similarities with the Andoke-Urekena, Arawak, Arutani, Máku, and Tukano language families due to contact.

Bibliography
Anderson, D. (1962). Conversational Ticuna. Yarinacocha: Summer Institute of Linguistics.
Anderson, L. (1961). Vocabulario breve del idioma ticuna. Tradición, 8:53-68.
de Alviano, F. (1944). Gramática, dictionário, verbos e frases e vocabulário prático da léngua dos índios ticunas. Rio de Janeiro: Imprensa Nacional.
Goulard, J.; Rodriguez Montes, M. E. (2013). Los yurí/juri-tikuna en el complejo socio-lingüístico del Noroeste Amazónico. LIAMES, 13:7-65.
Montes Rodríguez, M. E. (2003). Morfosintaxis de la lengua Tikuna (Amazonía colombiana). (CESO-CCELA, Descripciones, 15). Bogotá: Universidad de los Andes.

References

 
Language families